Bill Dudleston is the president and founder of Legacy Audio, a high-end audio and home theater equipment manufacturer located in Springfield, Illinois, United States. A member of the Audio Engineering Society and the American Institute of Chemical Engineers, Dudleston was recently inducted into a regional Hall of Fame, taking his place among mid-western Nobel scientists and statesmen. He is listed in Who's Who of American Businessmen.

A University of Illinois graduate and inventor/patent holder of numerous circuit topologies and acoustic alignments, Dudleston has pioneered controlled directivity loudspeaker designs, wave-launch coherence in low frequency radiators, dynamic braking in active speaker design, selectable directivity multi-way microphone arrays, feedback eliminating stage monitors, and isolated wall-mounting methods for in-wall/on-wall speaker systems.  His innovation in business practices, customer service and technology is noted in Tom Pettsinger’s The New Pioneers.  Dudleston has published numerous articles on acoustics and loudspeaker design. He also authored Reinforcement, Resonance, and Reverberation: Fundamentals in Sound Control.

Bill Dudleston has designed and provided Legacy speaker monitors for Arista, Sony, Universal Music Group and archival organizations such as the Stradivari Society. Multi-Grammy award-winning producers Rick Rubin, Antonio L.A. Reid, and renowned mastering engineer, Herb Powers, have utilized and publicly touted the Legacy designs as assisting in producing artists Sheryl Crow, Johnny Cash, Tom Petty, Red Hot Chili Peppers, Mariah Carey, and Usher.  Re-mastering engineer Steve Hoffman has utilized the Legacy speakers on re-issues of Elvis Presley, Frank Sinatra and Nat King Cole.

Legacy Audio and its founder have been cited in publications such as Billboard, The Wall Street Journal, Stereophile, The Absolute Sound, Home Theater Magazine and the Robb Report.  Dudleston continues as an innovator in the areas of DSP, digital amplification and wave-launch reconstruction while directing Legacy Audio’s research and development program.

References

External links
Legacy Audio

American acoustical engineers
American audio engineers
People from Springfield, Illinois
Living people
Year of birth missing (living people)
University of Illinois alumni
Engineers from Illinois